Henry Faati Naisali, CMG, AO, OBE (7 December 1928 – 20 October 2004) was a Tuvaluan politician who served as Deputy Prime Minister of Tuvalu (1985-1989), Secretary General of the Pacific Islands Forum (1988-1992) and Pro-Chancellor of The University of the South Pacific (1985-1990).  He is notable for co-founding the Tuvalu Trust Fund which lead Tuvalu to achieve greater financial autonomy.

He attended the Elisefou School on Vaitupu, the Ratu Kadavulevu and Queen Victoria schools in Fiji, St. Andrews College in Christchurch, New Zealand, and studied at Canterbury University College, 1954-1956. He joined the Gilbert and Ellice Islands civil service in 1952. He participated in the negotiations in London which resulted in the Gilbert and Ellice Islands colony being separated into the British colonies of Kiribati and Tuvalu.

Financial Secretary of the British Colony of Tuvalu 
He was appointed Financial Secretary of the British Colony of Tuvalu in 1976. He was elected to represent Nukulaelae in the House of Assembly of the British Colony of Tuvalu in the 1977 Tuvaluan general election. In the 1977 elections Naisali defeated by only 14 votes Isakala Paeniu who had been a minister in the administration of the Gilbert and Ellice Islands colony.

Finance Minister of Tuvalu
Tuvalu became fully independent within the Commonwealth on 1 October 1978. The first elections for the Parliament of Tuvalu were not held until 8 September 1981.

Naisali was elected to the Parliament of Tuvalu in the 1981 Tuvaluan general election and was appointed Minister of Finance and Deputy Prime Minister. He was re-elected in the 1985 Tuvaluan general election and was re-appointed finance minister and deputy prime minister in the government of prime minister Tomasi Puapua. He was appointed as the director of South Pacific Bureau for Economic Cooperation (SPEC) in 1986. In 1987, he was instrumental in the formation of the Tuvalu Trust Fund, which involving the governments of the United Kingdom, Australia and New Zealand providing the capital for a sovereign wealth fund to support the budget of the government of Tuvalu. Japan, and South Korea also contributed to the fund.

He was re-elected in the 1989 Tuvaluan general election, however he was not re-elected in the 1993 elections.

Pacific Islands Forum
Naisali was the Director of the South Pacific Bureau for Economic Co-operation (SPEC) from January 1986 to September 1988; he continued as Secretary General of the Pacific Islands Forum (PIF) until January 1992, following the formation of the PIF as successor of the SPEC.

Awards
Officer in the Order of Australia, Order of St Michael and George CMG, Order of the British Empire OBE and Member of the Order of the British Empire MBE.

References

1928 births
2004 deaths
Tuvaluan politicians
Deputy Prime Ministers of Tuvalu
Finance Ministers of Tuvalu
Government ministers of Tuvalu
Gilbert and Ellice Islands people
Secretaries General of the Pacific Islands Forum